Chardo may refer to:
 Chardon de Croisilles, a French trouvère
 Roman Catholic Kshatriya, a Konkani Catholic caste